Ensar Hajder (born 27 June 1991 in Tuzla, SFR Yugoslavia) is a Bosnian swimmer. He competed in the 200 m individual medley event at the 2012 Summer Olympics and was eliminated in the preliminaries.

References

1991 births
Living people
Sportspeople from Tuzla
Bosniaks of Bosnia and Herzegovina
Bosnia and Herzegovina male swimmers
Olympic swimmers of Bosnia and Herzegovina
Swimmers at the 2012 Summer Olympics
21st-century Bosnia and Herzegovina people